Heart Shaped World is the third album by Chris Isaak. Released in 1989, it became his breakthrough album and featured the Top 10 hit "Wicked Game". It is Isaak's best-selling album, being certified double platinum by the RIAA.

Reception

When Heart Shaped World was released in the summer of 1989, it was on the Billboard 200 for ten weeks, peaking at number 149; but in October 1990, after Lee Chesnut, music director of WAPW in Atlanta, played the song "Wicked Game" repeatedly over two weeks after hearing an instrumental version on the soundtrack from the 1990 David Lynch film Wild at Heart. "Wicked Game" was released as a single, and the album reached the U.S. Top 10 peaking at number 7 on the Billboard chart by April 1991, garnering sales of more than 500,000 copies. The video for the single, filmed in black and white, featured a topless Helena Christensen and a shirtless Isaak in the surf and on the beach. It was shown in heavy rotation on MTV.

In March 1991, Entertainment Weekly described the scene at the sold-out start of his post-"Wicked Game" release tour:
Reprise staged a gaudy, sold-out gig at L.A.'s Wiltern Theater. Sean Penn was there. So were Eric Roberts, k.d. lang, Dwight Yoakam, and, standing discreetly in a side aisle, Bruce Springsteen and Patti Scialfa. There were lots of young girls, whose screaming Isaak may have to get used to. Afterward came The Hollywood Party, where, amid more dazzling stars, Isaak (decked out in his shiny brocade stage suit) got his first gold record while the waiters passed around goat cheese quesadillas and a Hawaiian band played in the background. It was a lot to handle, but then, as Isaak had said the night before..., "I used to tar-paper roofs for a living. So, as far as I'm concerned, this is a pretty fun job."

At the first of a May 1991 two-night stand at the Beacon Theatre in New York City—the first in that city after "Wicked Game" became a top 10 hit— Isaak's performance was characterized as "consummate showmanship": performances "right on the edge of caricature" yet with the ability to "infuse the ballads "Wicked Game" and "Blue Spanish Sky" ... with a spine-tingling intensity."

Track listing

"Diddley Daddy" had been first released on Shag: Original Motion Picture Soundtrack (1989)

Personnel
Adapted from Discogs.
Musicians
 Chris Isaak – vocals, guitar
 James Calvin Wilsey – lead guitar
 Rowland Salley – bass guitar, vocals
 Kenney Dale Johnson – drums, vocals
Additional personnel
 Prairie Prince - drums, percussion
 Frank Martin - keyboards, piano
 Pete Scaturro - keyboards
 Christine Wall - vocals
 Cynthia Lloyd - vocals
 Chris Solberg - bass
 Joni Haastrup - keyboards
Production
 Erik Jacobsen – production
 Mark Needham – engineering
 Daniel Levitin – sound design
 Lee Herschberg – mixing assistance
 Greg Fulginiti at Artisan Sound Recorders – mastering
Lex Van Rossen - front cover photography

Sales and certifications

References

Chris Isaak albums
1989 albums
Reprise Records albums
Albums produced by Erik Jacobsen